Alessandro Adimari (1579 – 1649) was an Italian poet and classical scholar.

Biography 

Born at Florence about 1580, he published a free translation of Pindar in Italian verse, with notes and illustrations, Le Odi di Pindaro tradotte in parafrasi e in rima Toscana e dichiarate con osservazione e confronti di alcuni luoghi imitati e tocchi da Orazio, Pisa, 1631, 4º. Adimari, who dedicated his work to Cardinal Francesco Barberini, says that he spent sixteen years about it. He inserted synoptical sketches for the purpose of explaining the plan and order of the Greek poet in his odes. Pierre-Louis Ginguené, in the Biographie Universelle, art. Adimari, falsely charges him with having borrowed them from Erasmus Schmidt's Latin version of Pindar, published 1616. Adimari wrote also a kind of bibliography of poets La Mono-Grecia ove sono raccolti i nomi di tutti i Poeti dal principio della Poesia del Mondo sino al principio della Poesia Toscana ; Esequie di don Francesco de Medici, 1614, Florence, 4º ; and other minor works. Between 1637 and 1640 he published six collections of fifty sonnets each, under the names of six of the muses: “Terpsichore”, “Clio”, “Melpomene”, “Calliope”, “Urania”, and “Polyhymnia”. Particularly notable is the poetry collection “Terpsichore” (1637), composed of fifty-three highly manneristic sonnets. The sonnets are parodies of Petrarchan flattery, purporting to celebrate beauty in women who are too young or too old to be loved or who are ill or deformed. Following Seneca, Adimari claims that his verses might help husbands to accept the imperfections of their wives; he reminds his reader that just as there is no beauty without a flaw, so there is no flaw that does not also encompass beauty. The sonnets are masterfully witty rhetorical celebrations of such fancied paramours, sometimes savagely ridiculed by Adimari, who shows himself a master of the sonnet and highly attuned to the principal poetic tendencies of late Renaissance culture. Aßmann's translation of Adimari’s “Terpsichore” appeared in the 1704 collection as “Schertz-Sonnette oder Kling-Gedichte über die auch bey ihren Mängeln vollkommene und Lieb-würdige Schönheit des Frauenzimmers” (Playful Sonnets or Songs on the Perfect and Amiable Beauty of Women Even If Flawed). Adimari died in 1649.

Works

References

Bibliography 

  
 
 
 

Italian poets
Italian classical scholars
1579 births
1649 deaths
Baroque writers
16th-century Italian poets
16th-century male writers
17th-century Italian poets
Members of the Lincean Academy
People from Florence